Jacques de Villiers (born 19 August 1954) is a South African cricketer. He played in six first-class and three List A matches for Boland in 1980/81 and 1981/82.

See also
 List of Boland representative cricketers

References

External links
 

1954 births
Living people
South African cricketers
Boland cricketers
Cricketers from Paarl